is a 1984 Japanese film directed by Hideo Gosha. The lead star is Tatsuya Nakadai.

Plot
The film depicts the conflict between the prisoners forced to work as manpower of Hokkaido settlers and the administrators of the Kabato district as well as the love and hate of the women who gathered there during the Meiji era.

Cast
Tatsuya Nakadai as Takeshi Tsukigata 
Shima Iwashita as Yu Nakamura
Mari Natsuki as Suma
Isao Natsuyagi as Kakumu
Kōichi Satō as Yakichi
Kunihiko Mitamura as Denji Masaki
Masanari Nihei as Kumagai
Hiroshi Miyauchi as Unno
Reiko Nakamura as Hamagiku
Junko Takazawa
Shunsuke Kariya as Tsuyoshi
Arase Nagahide as Yoshida Susumu
Naruse Tadashi as Nakajima Senkichi
Hatsuo Yamane as Marutoku
Kai Atō as Ryuzo
Seizo Fukumoto
Arase Nagahide as Susumu Yoshida
Toru Masuoka as Kanda
Ai Saotome as Setsu Furuya
Yoshio Inaba as Besho Ken
Daisuke Ryu as Nagakura Shinpachi
Asao Koike as Yuhara Tadayoshi
Tetsuro Tamba as Ishikura
Mikio Narita as Kanbei kido
Shigeru Tsuyuguchi as Kōnoshin Oga

Production
 Yoshinobu Nishioka - Art direction

References

External links

1984 films
Films directed by Hideo Gosha
1980s Japanese-language films
Films about geisha
1980s Japanese films